Massimo Bonanni (born 10 June 1982) is an Italian football coach and a former player who played as a midfielder.

Football career
Bonanni started his career at A.S. Roma youth system. He spent on loan to Viterbese, Panachaiki and Vicenza.

Vicenza bought half of the player registration rights for €200,000 after a season long loan.

On 27 June 2005, he was bought back by Roma, for €500,000, and sold to Palermo on 1 July 2005, for €750,000 (the fee of signing Cesare Bovo on loan).

He made his Serie A debut against Parma F.C. on 28 August 2005. He played 4 games in UEFA Cup and 18 in Serie A before on loan to S.S. Lazio on 31 January 2006. U.C. Sampdoria acquired half of the player registration rights on 14 July 2006, for €2 million, along with Christian Terlizzi (50% for €1.5 million), as part of the Aimo Diana's transfer (€5 million).

He played 7 games in Serie A and 4 in Coppa Italia for Sampdoria, before loaned to Ascoli on 12 January 2007.
On 17 August 2007, Bonanni is on a one-year loan to Bari of Serie B. He returned to Genoa, but after played once in 2008–09 season, he left for Grosseto of Serie B. In June 2009 Palermo gave up the remain 50% registration rights to Sampdoria

On 31 July 2009, he signed a three-year contract with Pescara of Prima Divisione for free.

On 12 July 2011, he signed a two-year contract with Swiss Challenge League side FC Lugano on free transfer.

On 6 April 2012, he returned to Italy for Lugano's sister club Genoa (effective on 1 July 2012), however the sole purpose was transferred €1.45 million "transfer fee" to Lugano. He left for Serie B club U.S. Grosseto F.C. on 31 August 2012 but returned to Switzerland on 9 January 2013, in temporary deal from Genoa.

References

External links
 
 

Italian footballers
Italy youth international footballers
A.S. Roma players
U.S. Viterbese 1908 players
Panachaiki F.C. players
L.R. Vicenza players
Palermo F.C. players
S.S. Lazio players
U.C. Sampdoria players
Ascoli Calcio 1898 F.C. players
S.S.C. Bari players
F.C. Grosseto S.S.D. players
Delfino Pescara 1936 players
FC Lugano players
Genoa C.F.C. players
Serie A players
Serie B players
Serie C players
Football League (Greece) players
Swiss Challenge League players
Association football midfielders
Footballers from Rome
People from Ostia (Rome)
Italian expatriate footballers
Italian expatriate sportspeople in Greece
Italian expatriate sportspeople in Switzerland
Expatriate footballers in Greece
Expatriate footballers in Switzerland
1982 births
Living people
Italian football managers